Maurice Black may refer to:

Maurice Black (Australian politician) (1835–1899), (Maurice Hume Black) member of the Queensland Legislative Assembly
Maurice Black (Mississippi politician) (1915–2000), member of the Mississippi House of Representatives
Maurice Black (1891–1938), American movie actor
Maurice M. Black (1918–1996), American pathologist, expert on breast cancer